Pye Corner may refer to:

Pye Corner, an area of the village of Nash, Newport, Wales
Pye Corner, an area of the High Cross, Newport, Wales
Pye Corner railway station, Newport, Wales
Golden Boy of Pye Corner, a statue in London, England
Pye Corner Audio, a British electronic music project by Martin Jenkins